The 13th Legislative Assembly of Saskatchewan was elected in the Saskatchewan general election held in June 1956. The assembly sat from February 14, 1957, to May 4, 1960. The Co-operative Commonwealth Federation (CCF) led by Tommy Douglas formed the government. The Liberal Party led by Alexander Hamilton McDonald formed the official opposition.

James Andrew Darling served as speaker for the assembly.

Members of the Assembly 
The following members were elected to the assembly in 1956:

Notes:

Party Standings 

Notes:

By-elections 
By-elections were held to replace members for various reasons:

Notes:

References 

Terms of the Saskatchewan Legislature